The WAFU Zone A U-20 Championship is an association football tournament that is contested between competition contested by national teams of Zone A of the West African Football Union. The current champions are Gambia.

Eligible participants

2018 edition 
Eight teams were drawn in two groups of four from WAFU Zone A members including hosts Liberia, Senegal, Mali, Guinea, Cape Verde, Guinea Bissau, Sierra Leone and The Gambia. Mauritania declined to participate in the tournament and Cape Verde later withdrew to be replaced by Ivory Coast.

Tournaments

See also 

 WAFU Zone B U-20 Tournament
WAFU U-20 Championship

References

External links 

 WafuOnline.com - Official Site

West African Football Union competitions
WAFU U-20 Championship
International association football competitions in Africa